REFA, the Association for Work Design, Business Organization and Business Development is Germany's oldest organization for work design, business organization and business development.

It was founded in 1924 as the Reichsausschuß für Arbeitszeitermittlung (English: Reich Committee for Working Time Determination). During the Nazi era, it was known as the Reichsausschuß für Arbeitsstudien (English: Reich Committee for Labour Studies).

References

External links 
 https://refa.de/en/ (official English-language website)
 

1924 establishments in Germany
Adult education in Germany
Organisations based in Germany
Vocational education in Germany